The 1983 World Netball Championships was the sixth edition of the INF Netball World Cup, a quadrennial premier event in international netball. It took place from 11 to 24 June and was held in Singapore. This edition of the tournament featured 14 teams, of which Hong Kong and Malaysia both made their World Championship debut. Australia went undefeated in the first round then successfully defended its title going undefeated in the final round for their fifth title. New Zealand finished in second and Trinidad and Tobago came in third.

First round

Group A

Group B

Placement round

Group 9-14

Group 5-8

Final round

Final placings

Medallists

References

1983
1983 in netball
International netball competitions hosted by Singapore
June 1983 sports events in Asia